The Dead Line is a 1926 American silent Western film directed by Jack Nelson and starring Bob Custer, Nita Cavalier and Robert McKim.

Synopsis
Sonora Slim run across a man dying in the desert, who reveals he had discovered a potentially lucrative mine before being shot by a bandit.

Cast
 Bob Custer as Sonora Slim
 Nita Cavalier as Alice Wilson
 Robert McKim as 'Silver Sam' McGee
 Tom Bay as Snake Sneed
 Marianna Moya as Lolita
 Billy Franey as 'Extra' Long
 Gino Corrado asJuan Álavarez

References

Bibliography
 Connelly, Robert B. The Silents: Silent Feature Films, 1910-36, Volume 40, Issue 2. December Press, 1998.
 Munden, Kenneth White. The American Film Institute Catalog of Motion Pictures Produced in the United States, Part 1. University of California Press, 1997.

External links
 

1926 films
1926 Western (genre) films
1920s English-language films
American silent feature films
Silent American Western (genre) films
American black-and-white films
Films directed by Jack Nelson
Film Booking Offices of America films
1920s American films